Clarina is a village in County Limerick in the province of Munster, Ireland. It lies between Mungret and Kildimo on the N69 National Route about 6 miles west of Limerick city close to the River Maigue. The Maigue is a tributary of the River Shannon and enters the Shannon estuary between Limerick city and the mouth of the Deel river, Askeaton, county Limerick.

Clarina is within the Patrickswell-Ballybrown parish. The main area of interest is the nearby location of Carrigogunnell Castle.

Schools

Clarina has a National School called St. Josephs N.S. (mixed).

History

Clarina Castle, also known as Elm Park, was designed for the 3rd Baron Clarina in the late 1820s. Further work was undertaken by Rawson Carroll in the 1880s. It was demolished in the 1960s.

See also 
 List of towns and villages in Ireland

References

External links 
 Ballybrown Village
 Ballybrown Journal
 Ballybrown-Clarina GAA

Towns and villages in County Limerick